The 163rd (Canadien-Francais) Battalion, CEF was a unit in the Canadian Expeditionary Force during the First World War.  Based in Montreal, Quebec, the unit began recruiting in late 1915 throughout the province of Quebec.  In May 1916, the battalion sailed for the Imperial fortress of Bermuda, where it remained on garrison duty until late November of the same year.  After arriving in England, the battalion was absorbed into the 10th Reserve Battalion on January 8, 1917.  The 163rd (Canadien-Francais) Battalion, CEF had one Officer Commanding: Lieut-Col. H. DesRosiers.

The journalist Olivar Asselin was a member of the battalion.

The battalion is perpetuated by Les Fusiliers de Sherbrooke.

See also
Bermudians in the Canadian Expeditionary Force

References

Meek, John F. Over the Top! The Canadian Infantry in the First World War. Orangeville, Ont.: The Author, 1971.

Battalions of the Canadian Expeditionary Force